"You Turn Me On, I'm a Radio" is a song written and originally recorded by Canadian singer songwriter Joni Mitchell. It was released on her fifth studio album entitled For the Roses and was issued as a single as well.

Background 
Joni Mitchell originally wrote the song in response to her record label's desire for her to write a hit song. The song was recorded in preparation for Mitchell's then-upcoming fifth studio album in Hollywood, California at A&M Studios. Although Graham Nash, David Crosby, and Neil Young all contributed to the recording session for the song, only the harmonica piece performed by Graham Nash was included on the official release.

"You Turn Me On, I'm a Radio" was released as a single in November 1972 via Asylum Records. The song became Mitchell's first top-ten hit in Canada, reaching the tenth position on the RPM Top Singles chart. Additionally, the single became her first top-forty hit in the United States, reaching number twenty-five on the Billboard Hot 100. Outside North America, "You Turn Me On, I'm a Radio" peaked within the top forty on the Australian Kent Music Report chart. The single was included on Mitchell's fifth studio effort For the Roses, which was issued in November 1972.

Chart performance

"Urge for Going" 
The single features the only non-album B-side of Mitchell's career, a song originally recorded by Tom Rush that features on his 1968 album The Circle Game. Mitchell had performed the song since at least 1966 and was inspired by her hometown of Saskatoon.  The Mitchell version remained unreleased on LP until her 1996 compilation album Hits.

Gail Davies version 

Among numerous cover versions, American country artist Gail Davies released her version of "You Turn Me On, I'm a Radio" as a single in 1982. Davies befriended Joni Mitchell during the early 1970s after becoming a session musician for A&M Records in California. As a tribute to Mitchell, Davies decided to record the song. Following the single's release to radio, Davies was congratulated by both Mitchell and Henry Lewy. Lewy was responsible for introducing Davies to the self-production of her own recordings. The song was recorded at the "Producer's Workshop" in Hollywood, California, United States in July 1982. It was produced entirely by Davies in preparation for her fourth studio record Givin' Herself Away.

"You Turn Me On, I'm a Radio" was released as a single via Warner Bros. Records in June 1982. The song reached the seventeenth position on the Billboard Hot Country Singles chart in 1982. It became her seventh top-twenty hit on the country singles chart and her second from her fourth studio album. Additionally, the single peaked at number seven on the Canadian RPM Country Singles chart, becoming her second top-ten single on that chart.

Reception
Cash Box commented on the song's "interesting lyrical content."

Chart performance

References 

1972 songs
1972 singles
1982 singles
Joni Mitchell songs
Gail Davies songs
Songs written by Joni Mitchell
Song recordings produced by Joni Mitchell
Song recordings produced by Gail Davies
Asylum Records singles
Warner Records singles
Songs about radio